Charles Guy may refer to:

 Charles A. Guy (died 1985), American newspaper owner and editor
 Charles H. Guy (1924–2010), American football and lacrosse player and coach
 Charles L. Guy (1856–1930), American lawyer and politician from New York

See also
 Guy (surname)
 Charles Guy Briggle (1883–1972), United States district judge
 Charles Guy Parsloe (1900–1985), British historian, writer and Liberal Party politician